Elections in Vermont are authorized under Chapter II of the Vermont State Constitution, articles 43–49, which establishes elections for the state level officers, cabinet, and legislature. Articles 50–53 establish the election of county-level officers.

Elections are regulated under state statute, Title 17. The office of the Vermont Secretary of State has an Elections Division that oversees the execution of elections under state law.

According to a ranking by the Electoral Integrity Project in 2018,  Vermont ranked first among U.S. states in terms of electoral integrity. It scored 83 out of 100, its highest score being in the electoral procedures and results section (93) and lowest in the voter registration section (70).

In a 2020 study, Vermont was ranked as the 9th easiest state for citizens to vote in.

Administration

The U.S. state of Vermont holds its state general elections on the first Tuesday after the first Monday in November (better known as Election Day) in even-numbered years. As a result of this, general elections in Vermont systematically coincide with the biennial Elections in the United States.

Vermont has 150 seats in its House of Representatives, and 30 seats in its Senate.

An apparent election loser, behind by 2% or less of the total votes cast, may request a recount.

Immediately after an election, the poll officers in each town or city tally the ballots and municipal clerks report totals to the Vermont Secretary of State and the respective county clerk. County clerks would be involved in official recounts under the jurisdiction of the Superior Court.

Individuals may hold two or more sub-county-level offices concurrently should they win election to such. Countywide, legislature and higher officeholders may hold no more than one concurrent municipal-level office.

Election cycle
During November general elections in Vermont, elections are held for the positions of governor, lieutenant governor, secretary of state, treasurer, attorney general, auditor of accounts, state senator, state representative, state's attorney, assistant judge, probate judge, sheriff, high bailiff and justice of the peace, as well as occasional ballot questions and referendums. Officials elected to these offices are elected for a term of two or four years.

Parties internally reorganize every two years by holding state, county, and town committee elections during odd-numbered off-years.

State level
Vermont's governor, lieutenant governor, and other statewide executive officials are elected at-large. Two or three state senators are elected per county . One or two state representatives are elected per district.

County level

Countywide officials, including state's attorneys, judges, and sheriffs, are elected at-large per county every four years, and 3, 5, 7, 10, 12, or 15 county-level justices are elected per town, determined by population, or 15 per city.

Municipal level
Mayors, deputy or assistant mayors, city councilors, ward clerks, and inspectors of elections are elected on 2- or 3-year cycles by city, of which Vermont has 8. For towns and villages, municipal-level officials, including town clerks, town managers, moderators, selectboard members, town auditors, listers, grand jurors, constables, bailiffs, and trustees, are elected separately during town meetings on the first Tuesday after the first Monday in March.

Criteria for election

Vermont's Constitution requires that a gubernatorial or other statewide candidate achieve a majority of the popular vote (i.e. more than 50%) in order to be elected. If a candidate does not receive a majority of the vote, the General Assembly (state legislature) chooses from the three candidates who received the most votes. This has happened twenty times in Vermont history. Twice in the 18th century, fourteen times in the 19th century, three times in the 20th century, and once in the 21st century.

Primaries
Both the Vermont secretary of state and the chairperson of the state committee of each major party certifies primary elections under Vermont Statutes, Title 17, Chapter 51, article 2592.

Currently^, the Democratic, Progressive, Liberty Union, and Republican parties are qualified to hold primary elections in the state.

History

Voting patterns
Electorally, Republicans predominated for most of the state's history until the 1960s, even when the rest of the country was voting Democratic. Democrats started to become competitive in the 1970s, and have predominated at the polls since the 1990s. As a result, Vermont has sometimes voted contrarian in national elections. In 1832, Vermont was the only state voting for a presidential candidate from the Anti-Masonic Party. It was only one of two states to vote for William Howard Taft in 1912, and Vermont and Maine were the only states to vote against Franklin D. Roosevelt in all four of his successful presidential campaigns.

In 1955, voters elected Consuelo N. Bailey to be lieutenant governor, the first woman to be elected to that position in the country. Prior to 1915, Vermont held its general election in September. Because it was one of the earliest elections in the nation, it was carefully followed. National politicians campaigned in the state in the summer to influence the turnout, including Ulysses S. Grant, William McKinley and Theodore Roosevelt. While the vote was assured for the Republican party at that time, the size of victory was thought by some, before polls, to predict how the national elections might go.

Republicans dominated Vermont elections from the party's founding in 1854 until the mid-1970s. From 1856 to 1988, Vermont voted Republican in every presidential election with only one exception in 1964. Vermont consecutively had Republican governors for over a century until Democrat Phillip Hoff was elected in 1962. Prior to the 1960s, rural interests dominated the legislature. 
As in the early 1960s, many progressive Vermont Republicans and newcomers from New York state helped bolster the state's small Democratic Party. However, since 1962, no successive governor has been from the same party as their predecessor. 

By 1970, the population of those aged between 18 and 34 increased by half, owing to in-migration. Many of those were hippies or had a more liberal outlook than existing residents. The state grew from 444,732 in 1970 to 511,456 in 1980, the largest increase since the Civil War. 59% of this growth was from out of state.

In 1980, Vermont gave independent candidate John B. Anderson 15% of its vote, thereby tipping the state to Republican Ronald Reagan.

Since 1992, Vermont had supported a Democrat for president in every election, and by double-digit margins all but once (in 2000). Republicans have not seriously contested the state since then, and Vermont is now reckoned as part of the "Blue Wall." Vermont gave John Kerry his fourth-largest margin of victory in 2004, behind the District of Columbia, Massachusetts, and Rhode Island. He won the state's popular vote by 20 percentage points over incumbent George W. Bush, taking 58.9% of the vote. Essex County in the state's northeastern section was the only county to vote for Bush. Vermont still remains the only state that President Bush has not visited. On the other hand, Republican governor Douglas won all counties but Windham in the 2006 election. Vermonters have been ticket-splitters. Underlining how Republican Vermont once was, Donald Trump and George W. Bush are the only Republicans to win the White House without carrying Vermont. The 2020 election, was the first time the state was the most Democratic in the nation.

Recent Elections
Vermont's 2006 state general election was held on November 7, 2006. The state's last state primary election was held on September 12, 2006.

In 2008, the Democrats, in charge of the House, appointed Richard Westman, a Republican, to chair the Transportation Committee. When he resigned in 2009 to accept a post elsewhere, the leadership appointed another Republican, Patrick M. Brennan to that chair.

In 2008, an Associated Press poll found that Vermonters self-described themselves as "liberal" (32%) more often than any other state in the union, behind only the District of Columbia. In 2009, the state had a Cook Partisan Voting Index of D+13, tying with Hawaii to be the most Democratic state in the country, exceeded only by the District of Columbia.

In January 2010 nine Vermonters announced they were planning to run for several state offices: governor, lieutenant governor and seven seats in the state Senate on a Vermont secession platform. The candidates did not organize a formal political party organization but are running as individuals under the "Vermont Independence Party" label.

Political parties in Vermont

Political party affiliation was not a factor in Vermont politics from 1778 to 1797. Starting in 1798, leading politicians were members of the Democratic-Republican Party until about 1830. Thereafter, Anti-Masonic Party, National Republican Party, and Whig Party politicians held sway until 1855.

Starting in 1854, the state voted solidly Republican until 1962. Starting in 1963, the governor's office alternated between the Democratic and Republican parties with each election. In 1987, the Democratic Party captured both chambers of the legislature. Since 1987, Vermont House and Senate have each been Democratic for all but two of the eleven terms between then and 2013. For many years, Vermont was a stronghold of the Republican Party.

In the late 1980s, the Progressive Party was formed, and began electing candidates to local and statewide offices. Some candidates ran for office with the nomination of both the Progressive and Democratic Parties, although this was sometimes avoided for fear of the Progressives getting simply absorbed into the larger Democratic Party. With the exception of the more conservative and rural Northeast Kingdom, Rutland County, and Bennington County, the Progressive and Democratic Parties have become the two dominant political forces, with the Republican Party being relegated to third ever since its loss in popularity in the state since the 1980s onward. The success of the party led to it becoming the most successful third party in any US state, and secured Vermont as a multi-party political environment.

Other contemporary parties operating in Vermont include the Liberty Union Party (1970), Libertarian Party (1972), and Green Mountain Party (2015).

Political parties
Vermont law requires political parties to reorganize in every odd-numbered year by electing members at town caucuses and then sending representatives to county committees, which send representatives to the state committee meeting. Statute exempts minor parties from holding county meetings. The Vermont Secretary of State maintains a list of designated major and minor parties.

Major political parties in Vermont
Democratic
Progressive
Republican

Minor political parties in Vermont
Liberty Union
Libertarian
Green Mountain Party

The Vermont Progressive Party is a progressive, liberal, populist, left-wing political party that currently holds 6 seats in the Vermont legislature^. Since 1990, it has run candidates for numerous state and local elections. Progressives Peter Clavelle and Bob Kiss were mayors of the largest city, Burlington from 1989–1993, 1995–2006, and 2006–2012, respectively. It formed as a coalition closely associated with then Burlington mayor Bernie Sanders in the late 1980s and has had official recognition as a major political party by the state government since 1999.

As of 2013, the Vermont Libertarian Party had two elected municipal officials.

In 2010 the Liberty Union Party, a long-time Vermont democratic socialist party, fielded nine candidates in statewide elections.

Federal officals
Vermont is one of only three states represented by a member of the United States Congress who does not currently associate with a political party: Senator Bernie Sanders describes himself as a socialist and progressive, but caucuses with the Democrats in the selection of the Senate leadership. He was a member of the United States House of Representatives from 1991 to 2007 when he was elected to the U.S. Senate. Sanders often votes with the Democratic Party, but maintains his status as an independent in Congress. He is the only member of the Congressional Progressive Caucus in the Senate and was its first chair from 1991 to 1999. He is heavily supported during campaigns in his home state by the Progressive Party and the Democratic Party, though Sanders declines both parties' official nomination.

Peter Welch is the state's Democratic senator since 2023.

Becca Balint has represented Vermont in the House since 2023, replacing Peter Welch.

See also 

Government of Vermont
Politics of Vermont
Voter's oath
Elections in the United States
Political party strength in Vermont

Gubernatorial elections by year:
Vermont gubernatorial election, 2000
Vermont gubernatorial election, 2004
Vermont gubernatorial election, 2006
Vermont gubernatorial election, 2008
Vermont gubernatorial election, 2010
Vermont gubernatorial election, 2012
Vermont gubernatorial election, 2016
US House of Representatives elections by year:
United States House of Representatives election in Vermont, 2000
United States House of Representatives election in Vermont, 2006
United States House of Representatives election in Vermont, 2008
United States House of Representatives election in Vermont, 2010
United States House of Representatives election in Vermont, 2012
United States House of Representatives election in Vermont, 2014
United States House of Representatives election in Vermont, 2016
US Senate elections by year:
United States Senate election in Vermont, 2004
United States Senate election in Vermont, 2006
United States Senate election in Vermont, 2010
United States Senate election in Vermont, 2012
United States Senate election in Vermont, 2016
Other Vermont elections by year:
Vermont elections, 2006
Vermont elections, 2008
Vermont elections, 2010
Vermont elections, 2012
Vermont elections, 2014
Vermont elections, 2016
 United States presidential elections in Vermont
Presidential elections by year:
United States presidential election in Vermont, 2000
United States presidential election in Vermont, 2004
United States presidential election in Vermont, 2008
United States presidential election in Vermont, 2012
United States presidential election in Vermont, 2016

References

Notes

External reference
Elections Division at the Vermont Secretary of State official website
Vermont Election Information and Resources

 
 
  (State affiliate of the U.S. League of Women Voters)
 

 
Government of Vermont
Political events in Vermont